Saint Anthony's Catholic Church is a historic church building at 470 North Wilson Avenue, just north of the crossroads community of Ratcliff, Arkansas.  It is a single-story wood-frame structure, with a gabled roof and weatherboard siding.  A square tower projects from the center of the main facade, capped by a pyramidal roof and cross, with gablets on each side.  The main entrance is at the center of the tower, sheltered by a hood with a similar style as the tower roof.  The church was built in 1903 under the auspices of the local Subiaco Abbey as a mission serving arriving German Catholic immigrants.

The church was listed on the National Register of Historic Places in 1986.

See also
National Register of Historic Places listings in Logan County, Arkansas

References

Churches on the National Register of Historic Places in Arkansas
National Register of Historic Places in Logan County, Arkansas
Churches completed in 1903
Buildings and structures in Logan County, Arkansas